Grace Submerged, the second and final  album by Norwegian doom/gothic metal band Octavia Sperati, was released in May 2007 via Candlelight Records.

Background 
Grace Submerged was produced by Herbrand Larsen, who also plays keyboards and was the engineer on some albums of Enslaved.  Ivar Bjørnson (guitarist for this band) makes an appearance here, co-writing "Dead End Poem".

The album features an interpretation of the Phil Lynott-penned "Don't Believe A Word", which Terrorizer Magazine called "a chilling ballad". Krister Dreyer ("Morfeus") plays the piano and keyboards in that song and the samples in "Submerged".

The song "Moonlit" was released as a music video.

Track listing

Personnel

Octavia Sperati 
Silje Wergeland – vocals
Bodil Myklebust – guitar
Gyri S. Losnegaard – guitar
Trine C. Johansen – bass
Tone Midtgaard – keyboard
Ivar Alver – drums

Additional musicians 
  Morfeus (Krister Dreyer) - keyboards, piano & samplings in tracks 4 & 10

Production and Engineering 
Produced, engineered and mixed by Herbrand Larsen
Co-engineer – Arve "Ice Dale" Isdal
Mastered By – Jaimee Gomez
Artwork By [Cover Art & Layout] – Richard Lock
Photography [Band Photos] – Tommy Næss
Recorded and produced in Earshot Studio, Bergen November/December 2006. 
Track 4 and keyboards, piano and samplings on all tracks recorded in MOF Studio in Sandefjord. 
Guitar on track 6 recorded in Earshot Studio. 
Mixed at Lydriket/Your Favourite Music.

External links 
Discogs.com
Metallum Archives

2007 albums
Octavia Sperati albums
Candlelight Records albums